Tarbert are a Gaelic Athletic Association Gaelic football club in Tarbert, County Kerry, Ireland. They play in the Kerry Junior Championship, Div 2 County League and Div 1 North Kerry Championship.

History

The club was founded on Sunday 30 July 1899 when Tarbert and Ballylongford began their great rivalry that was to extend well into the twentieth century. Tarbert has a long and proud record in under age competitions which are recorded in great detail in a book which was compiled by Tarbert Bord Na nÓg. This publication which is entitled Tarbert G.A.A. A Century of the Red and Black. Won 2010 North Kerry Championship in an epic replay against Listowel Emmets. Winning by only one point with a goal coming in added time in extra time.

All Ireland medal winners

Senior
Jim Wren
Tom O Donnell
Shane Enright
Junior
Thomas O Donnell
Mickie McElligott
Mickie Buckley
Under 21
Gerald O Sullivan
Tommy Bridgeman
Shane Enright
Minor
Gerald O Sullivan
Michael Wren
Mickie Buckley
Denis Dillane
Kieran O Connor
Fr. Tommy O Hanlon
Fintan Scannell
Tommy Bridgeman

Notable players

Shane Enright All-Ireland Under 21 & Senior winning. 2015 All-Star winner 
 John O'Connell 
 Shaun McGinley

Roll of honour

 North Kerry Senior Football Championship: (7) 1942, 1948, 1969, 1973, 1985, 1990, 2010
 Kerry Intermediate Football Championship: (1) 1977
 Kerry Junior Football Championship: (2) 1930, 1995

References

External links
Official Tarbert GAA Club website

Gaelic games clubs in County Kerry
Gaelic football clubs in County Kerry